The National Palace of Culture (short NDK) is one of the major music venues in Sofia, Bulgaria. The main Hall 1 with its more than 3500 comfortable seats has hosted many famous performers and hit spectacles.

Below is a list of some of the events that have been held there.

Hall 1

Rock, pop and jazz performers

Bands

Solo artists

Classical music performers and other spectacles

References

External links
 Official website

Concerts at NDK, Sofia
Lists of events by venue
Concerts at NDK, Sofia
Lists of concerts and performances by location
Entertainment events in Bulgaria